The 1949 Individual Speedway World Championship was the fourth edition of the official World Championship to determine the world champion rider.

It was the first running of the event since its suspension in 1939, due to World War II. The World final at London's Wembley Stadium, was held in front of a reported 93,000 strong crowd and the Championship was won Tommy Price.

Qualification (Championship Round)

Venues
 8 August 1949 –  London, Wimbledon Stadium
 10 August 1949 –  London, New Cross Stadium
 22 August 1949 –  Birmingham, Perry Barr Stadium
 25 August 1949 –  London, Wembley Stadium
 27 August 1949 –  Manchester, Hyde Road Stadium
 27 August 1949 –  Bradford, Odsal Stadium
 30 August 1949 –  London, West Ham Stadium
 2 September 1949 –  London, Harringay Stadium

Scores
Top 16 qualify for World final, 17th & 18th reserves for World final

World final
22 September 1949
 London, Wembley Stadium

References

1949
Individual Speedway World Championship
Individual Speedway World Championship
Individual Speedway
Individual Speedway
Individual Speedway World Championship
Individual Speedway World Championship
Speedway competitions in the United Kingdom